To Save Her Soul is a 1909 American short silent drama film directed by D. W. Griffith and starring Mary Pickford. The film was shot in Fort Lee, New Jersey when many of the early film studios in America's first motion picture industry were based there at the beginning of the 20th century.

Cast
 Arthur V. Johnson - Paul Redmond
 Mary Pickford - Agnes Hailey
 W. Chrystie Miller - Church Organist
 George Nichols - Manager
 Kate Bruce - Housekeeper
 Linda Arvidson - In Audience
 William Beaudine
 Charles Craig - Bumpkin
 Frank Evans - Stage Manager
 Robert Harron - Stagehand / Usher
 Ruth Hart - At Party
 James Kirkwood - Backstage at Debut / At Party
 Henry Lehrman - In Audience
 Jeanie MacPherson - In Audience
 Owen Moore - At Party
 Jack Pickford - Stagehand
 Lottie Pickford
 Billy Quirk
 Gertrude Robinson - In Audience
 Paul Scardon - In Audience
 Mack Sennett - Backstage at Debut
 Blanche Sweet - Backstage at Debut / At Party
 Dorothy West - At Party

See also
 D. W. Griffith filmography
 Mary Pickford filmography
 Blanche Sweet filmography

References

External links

1909 films
1909 drama films
1909 short films
Silent American drama films
American silent short films
Biograph Company films
American black-and-white films
Films directed by D. W. Griffith
Films shot in Fort Lee, New Jersey
1900s American films